The 2021 KNVB Cup Final was a football match between Eredivisie clubs Ajax and Vitesse, that took place on 18 April 2021 at De Kuip, Rotterdam. It was the final match of the 2020–21 KNVB Cup, the 103rd season of the annual Dutch national football cup competition.

Ajax won the match 2–1 for a record twentieth title. As winners, they will compete in the 2021 Johan Cruyff Shield and earned a spot in the 2021–22 UEFA Europa League play-off round if they do not qualify for the 2021–22 UEFA Champions League.

It was announced in March 2021 that there would be no fans at the match due to the COVID-19 pandemic.

Route to the final

Match

Notes

References

2021
2020–21 in Dutch football
AFC Ajax matches
SBV Vitesse matches
April 2021 sports events in the Netherlands
Sports competitions in Rotterdam
21st century in Rotterdam